Leticia Muñoz Moreno (born 1985 in Madrid) is a Spanish violinist. She began her music education at the early age of 3 in both violin and piano with the Suzuki Method offering her first recitals when she was just 5. In 1996 she studied six years with Zakhar Bron at the Escuela Superior de Música Reina Sofía and in Germany at Köln Musikhochschule. Later on she followed the advice of Maxim Vengerov in Saarbrücken and David Takeno at the Guildhall School of Music and Drama where she received the highest grade ever in the history of the school for her final recital. Her last teacher was Rostropovich since 2003.

Since 2005 Leticia Moreno has been playing a 1679 Pietro Guarneri violin, which is the property of the Stradivari Society of Chicago. She has played concerts all around the world: Austria, England, St. Petersburg, Moscow, Italy, Poland, South America, Mexico and Spain, and with orchestras including the Chicago Symphony Orchestra and Vienna Symphony Orchestra.

The Spanish composer Francisco Lara has dedicated one composition to her: Capriccio for Leticia (2005).

Awards

 Spanish Interpreters Association, 1996, 1999 and 2000
 Juventudes Musicales of Spain, 1997, 1998 and 2001
 Henryk Szeryng Competition, 2000
 Concertino Praga, 2000
 Novosibirsk, 2001
 Pablo de Sarasate Prize, 2001
 Emily Anderson Prize, 2005
 Lotto-Förderpreis des Rheingau Musik Festivals, 2010

References
 Leticia Moreno at the website of the Royal Philharmonic Society
 Leticia Moreno at the website of the Southeast Asian Youth Orchestra and Wind Ensemble
 Leticia Moreno official web-site

1985 births
Living people
Alumni of the Guildhall School of Music and Drama
Reina Sofía School of Music alumni
Spanish classical violinists
21st-century classical violinists
Women classical violinists
21st-century Spanish musicians
21st-century women musicians